Patrick Journoud (27 April 1964 – 16 January 2015) was a French discus thrower. He competed in the discus at the 1988 Summer Olympics.

References

1964 births
2015 deaths
French male discus throwers
Athletes (track and field) at the 1988 Summer Olympics
Olympic athletes of France
Sportspeople from Casablanca